The men's long jump event at the 1998 Commonwealth Games was held 19–20 September in Kuala Lumpur.

Medalists

Results

Qualification
Qualification: 8.00 m (Q) or at least 12 best (q) qualified for the final.

Final

References

Long
1998